On My Way is the second major album release by New Jersey Latin rock band, deSoL. The album had its start while the band took a month off from touring in January 2006. After the success of their AAA top 10 single, Karma and a lengthy tour, the band started 2006 with a trip to Texas. They spent a month at Sonic Ranch, a boutique recording studio in the middle of a Pecan farm outside El Paso. With the benefit of isolation and virtually no phone service, the band spent their days rehearsing and working on writing new material inspired by their travels of the previous 2–3 years. A collection of 20 songs arose out of these informal sessions and demos were recorded by the band. This album was created and financed independently after the band left their previous label, CURB Records. The band then set about recording the album back in New Jersey with producer Jon Leidersdorff at his Lakehouse Recording Studio in Asbury Park. The cover photo is a detail of a live photo taken by tour manager Jessica Erickson during a show in Boston.

Track listing
"On My Way" 3:25  (Monterrosa/Guerrero/Letke/Leidersdorff)
"Letter From San Juan" 2:56  (Monterrosa/Apple)
"Sing It All Night" 3:24  (Monterrosa/Apple/Leidersdorff)
"Mona Lisa" 4:29  (Monterrosa/Guerrero/Leidersdorff)
"Every Little Love Song" 3:47  (Monterrosa/Leidersdorff)
"Good Night Love" 3:25  (Monterrosa/Leidersdorff)
"Ghost In The House of Texas" 4:09  (Monterrosa/Apple/Leidersdorff)
"Santos" 3:32  (Monterrosa/Apple/Guerrero/Leidersdorff)
"El Salvador" 3:14  (Monterrosa/Leidersdorff)
"Teardrops" 3:38  (Monterrosa/Leidersdorff/Greenberg)
"Lagrimas" 3:13  (Monterrosa/Guillen/Leidersdorff)
"Vivir en tu Aire" 4:27  (Monterrosa/Leidersdorff)
"Free Again" 3:14  (Monterrosa/Apple/Leidersdorff)
"Todo Mi Cancion (Sing It All Night, Spanish version)" 3:32  (Monterrosa/Apple/Leidersdorff_

Personnel
deSoL
Albie Monterrosa – acoustic and electric guitars, piano, lead vocals
Andy Letke – piano, organ, banjo, vocals
James Guerrero – percussion, vocals
Chris Apple – bass guitar, vocals, trumpet

Additional personnel:
Kevin Ansell – electric and acoustic, vocals
Ray Turull – timbales, percussion
Jon Leidersdorff – drums
Eric Novad – drums on "On My Way" and "Santos"
Carmireli – co-lead vocals on "Teardrops"
Michael Ramos – accordion on "Free Again"
Kevin Patrick – strings and additional keyboards

Production
Producer: Jon Leidersdorff
Engineers: Rob Lebret
Mastered by: Tom Ruff

Charts

Singles

DeSoL albums
2007 albums